Titus Jhon Londouw Bonai (born 4 March 1989), nicknamed Tibo, is a former Indonesian footballer who played as a forward.

Club career
Bonai began his career with the Persipura Jayapura U21 in 2008; he also underwent training for the team PON Papua. He has played for Bontang and Persiram Raja Ampat and later for Persipura Jayapura again. In 2012, he joined at Thailand club BEC Tero Sasana, but failed to secure a contract. Later he was signed by Indonesia Premier League club Semen Padang.

In November 2014, he signed with Sriwijaya. Soon afterwards he was appointed as captain of the team for the 2015 Sriwijaya F.C. season.

International career
He earned his first cap for the Indonesia U23 team in May 2009, in a Friendly match against Iran U23. Bonai received his first senior international cap against Philippines on 5 June 2012.

Personal life
Titus is the brother of Arthur Barrios Bonai.

Career statistics

International

International goals
Titus Bonai: International under-23 goals

|}

Honours

Club
Persipura Jayapura
 Indonesia Super League: 2010–11
Semen Padang
Indonesian Community Shield: 2013

International
Indonesia U-23
Southeast Asian Games  Silver medal: 2011

Individual
 Indonesian Soccer Awards: Best 11 2019

References

External links
 
 

1989 births
Living people
People from Jayapura
Sportspeople from Papua
Papuan people
Indonesian footballers
Association football forwards
Indonesia international footballers
Indonesia youth international footballers
Liga 1 (Indonesia) players
Liga 2 (Indonesia) players
Indonesian Premier League players
Bontang F.C. players
Sriwijaya F.C. players
Persiram Raja Ampat players
Persipura Jayapura players
Semen Padang F.C. players
PSM Makassar players
Borneo F.C. players
Muba Babel United F.C. players
PSMS Medan players
PSIS Semarang players
Southeast Asian Games silver medalists for Indonesia
Southeast Asian Games medalists in football
Competitors at the 2011 Southeast Asian Games
Indonesian expatriate footballers
Indonesian expatriate sportspeople in East Timor
Expatriate footballers in East Timor
21st-century Indonesian people